WNRN (91.9 FM) is a non-commercial, listener-supported radio station licensed to Charlottesville, Virginia, serving Central and Western Virginia.  The station has a board of directors consisting of local community members and is incorporated as the non-profit Stu-Comm, Inc.

WNRN has an adult album alternative (AAA) radio format.  It is a member of National Public Radio and is the Charlottesville network affiliate for NPR's World Cafe and All Songs Considered.  Specialty shows heard on weekends including Bluegrass Sunday Morning, Fresh Rock and New Blues, Les Temps Perdu and The Grateful Dead and Phriends.  WNRN is a Triple-A reporter for  Billboard, Mediabase and FMQB.

WNRN has a network of rebroadcasters and FM translators around Virginia.  It holds periodic fundraisers on the air to support the station and network.  The main station has an effective radiated power (ERP) of 320 watts, with its transmitter off Carter's Mountain Trail in Charlottesville.

History

Early years
In 1993, Mike Friend, a former operations manager at WTJU (owned and operated by the University of Virginia), incorporated Stu-Comm, Inc. "with the purpose of building a non-commercial FM radio station for the Charlottesville-Albemarle area." WNRN took the call sign WANJ during the construction process. WNRN was originally registered as an "educational nonprofit".

In 2006, the station gained a direct commercial competitor in pop-oriented AAA station WCNR (106.1 FM), branded as "106.1 The Corner". Founder and then-general manager Mike Friend banned the word "corner" from his airwaves for a time after WCNR signed on.

Expansion 
In 2000, WNRN began expanding its service area outside of Charlottesville: first by renting airtime on WUDZ (now WNRS-FM), then the Sweet Briar College student radio station, followed by several purchases of translator stations in Lexington, Richmond, Harrisonburg and Lovingston in 2006 and 2007. Stu-Comm, Inc. purchased WNRS-FM outright in 2010, increasing its height and power in order to reach Lynchburg. Although the main signal from Carters Mountain nominally has good coverage in the lower elevations to the east, including Richmond, interference from co-channel WGTS in Washington, D.C. cuts down on reception in those areas.

Stu-Comm, Inc. took additional steps to improve its terrestrial signals in 2016, starting with the acquisition of WFTH (1590 AM) in Richmond, which enabled it to purchase and move in an additional FM translator under the Federal Communications Commission's (FCC) "AM revitalization" program. This new translator, W203CB on 88.5 FM from Midlothian, became WNRN's primary Richmond-area signal on February 2, 2018. W203CB replaced W276BZ (103.1 FM), which prompted listener complaints as it broadcast at only 10 watts and had difficulty covering the city.

In May 2018, Stu-Comm received permission from the FCC to boost the WNRN signal from Carters Mountain to 560 watts.  But the station did not complete the construction.

Hanover County-based WHAN (1430 AM), with a transmitter and FM translator (W275BQ, 102.9 FM) located in Ashland and covering the northern suburbs of Richmond, filed an agreement donating its license and facilities to Stu-Comm, Inc. on July 31, 2020; this gave WNRN a third and fourth signal covering the city. The action came concurrently with the FCC repeal of a longstanding rule prohibiting co-owned AM stations with substantial signal overlap from simulcasting each other. WHAN came under Stu-Comm, Inc.'s control on October 14.

In 2022, Stu-Comm entered the Hampton Roads market with the purchase of WRJR (670 AM), which is licensed to Claremont in Surry County but has a signal powerful enough to cover the entire region during the day. WRJR's companion FM translator W273DZ (102.5 FM) is located in Williamsburg. WNRN programming commenced on June 3.

Personnel 
The station made local headlines when Mike Friend was unexpectedly fired as manager by the board of directors in April 2011, although he was kept on as the station engineer. Friend left WNRN altogether in 2013 and founded Blue Ridge Free Media, the licensee of WXRK-LP (92.3 FM). The station's assistant general manager, Anne Williams, became acting general manager. Mark Keefe replaced Dave Benson as general manager and program director May 31, 2014.

As of June 2020, Ian Solla-Yates served as development director and Lauren Velardi as membership director. Desiré Moses was managing producer, host, and music writer. Bob Mosolgo was Morning Host. Amber Hoback is music director.

Longtime "Acoustic Sunrise" host Anne Williams worked her last on-air shift on February 15, 2019, after a two-decade run as a cornerstone of the station's schedule. Williams took a management position at Knoxville Americana station WDVX.

Repeaters

WNRN's programming is aired full-time on four additional full-powered stations:

There are also six low-powered translators. Through a partnership with the Virginia Tech Foundation, two are fed by HD subchannels of Radio IQ stations.

See also
List of community radio stations in the United States

References

External links

91-9 WNRN Online

Article: Anne Williams feature
Article: Richmond's burning: for WNRN music
Article: Tunes for the Road from the Washington Post
Article: Gaining Frequency from The Daily Progress

NRN
Modern rock radio stations in the United States
Adult album alternative radio stations in the United States
Community radio stations in the United States
Radio stations established in 1996
1996 establishments in Virginia
Mass media in Charlottesville, Virginia